Iron Range is a coastal locality in the Shire of Cook, Queensland, Australia. The town of Portland Road is on a north-east headland in the locality.

Geography 
Iron Range is on the north-east coast of the Cape York Peninsula.

Weymouth Bay is off the north-eastern coast of locality.

All of the locality of Iron Range is occupied by the Kutini Payamu National Park (formerly the Iron Range National Park).

History
The town of Portland Road is named after the harbour of the same name. The harbour first appeared on an 1897 British Admiralty Chart.

On 11 November 1948, as part of a centenary commemoration, a monument to explorer Edmund Kennedy and his ill-fated expedition to explore Cape York Peninsula was erected at Portland Road near a spring where the expedition drew water in 1848.

On 11 April 2014, the former locality of Lockhart was split into two new localities: Iron Range and Lockhart River. The locality of Iron Range takes its name from the Iron Range National Park (now known as the Kutini-Payamu National Park).

Heritage listings 
Iron Range has a number of heritage-listed sites, including:
 Gordon's Mine and Mill

References

 
Shire of Cook
Coastline of Queensland
Localities in Queensland